Meath was a parliamentary constituency represented in Dáil Éireann, the lower house of the Irish parliament or Oireachtas from 1923 to 1937 and from 1948 to 2007. The method of election was proportional representation by means of the single transferable vote (PR-STV).

History and boundaries
The constituency was first created under the Electoral Act 1923 for the 1923 general election, electing 3 deputies (Teachtaí Dála, commonly known as TDs). It was abolished in 1937. It was recreated under the Electoral (Amendment) Act 1947 for the 1948 general election, again electing 3 deputies. It gained a fourth seat in 1977 and a fifth seat in 1981.

It was abolished for the 2007 general election, being divided into the two new 3-seat constituencies of Meath East and Meath West.

The constituency spanned the entire area of County Meath in Leinster, taking in Navan, Trim and Ashbourne. It also included small parts of County Kildare.

TDs

TDs 1923–1937

TDs 1948–2007

Elections

2005 by-election

2002 general election

1997 general election

1992 general election

1989 general election

1987 general election

November 1982 general election

February 1982 general election

1981 general election

1977 general election

1973 general election

1969 general election

1965 general election

1961 general election

1959 by-election 
Following the death of Fianna Fáil TD James Griffin, a by-election was held on 22 July 1959. The seat was won by Fianna Fáil candidate Henry Johnston.

1957 general election

1954 general election

1951 general election

1948 general election

1933 general election

1932 general election

September 1927 general election

June 1927 general election

1923 general election

See also 
Dáil constituencies
Politics of the Republic of Ireland
Historic Dáil constituencies
Elections in the Republic of Ireland

References

External links 
Oireachtas Members Database

Historic constituencies in County Meath
Dáil constituencies in the Republic of Ireland (historic)
1923 establishments in Ireland
1937 disestablishments in Ireland
Constituencies established in 1923
Constituencies disestablished in 1937
1948 establishments in Ireland
2007 disestablishments in Ireland
Constituencies established in 1948
Constituencies disestablished in 2007